Suchi may refer to:

 Suchi, needle in Sanskrit is also a name of vyuha formation in Hindu epic Mahabharata
 Suchi (politician), Indian politician
 Suchitra, Indian singer and actress, also known as Suchi
 Suchi, Raebareli, a village in Uttar Pradesh, India

See also
 Sushi (disambiguation)